Emily Meggett is a Geechee-Gullah community leader, chef, and author who co-wrote Gullah Geechee Home Cooking: Recipes from the Matriarch of Edisto Island in 2022. She lives in Edisto Island, a town of about 2000 people near Charleston, South Carolina.

Early life 

Meggett was born in 1933 in Sea Island, Georgia and grew up with Gullah culture, a set of food, rituals, and language that took roots when West and Central Africans were brought to the Southern United States and enslaved. The culture survives in coastal enclaves in the Carolinas, Georgia, and Florida.

Meggett grew up in a large family. She has four siblings and more than a dozen aunts and uncles. When she was young, her family grew vegetables, beans and fruit and had a rice pond. The family raised livestock like hogs and chickens.

Career 

As a teenager, Meggett babysat for local families, but because the pay was bad, her mother suggested finding a higher paying job or working in the fields. Meggett began cooking and offering home help to wealthy white families, including the Dodge family that regularly visited Edisto Island from Maine and employed Meggett on-and-off for 45 years. She also worked secretary at a community center for 28 years, only quitting when the office got computers.

Writing 

On April 26, 2022, Meggett released Gullah Geechee Home Cooking: Recipes from the Matriarch of Edisto Island, a series of recipes and stories that she co-wrote with American food journalist Kayla Stewart. The book features 123 recipes central to Gullah culture, such as okra soup, deviled crabs and chicken perloo, most of which have African antecedents. A featured recipe benne wafers, sweet cookies made from benne seeds which slaves brought from Africa and kept in hidden gardens. Her meals feature ingredients like salt pork, rice, and local vegetables.

Recognition 
On July 22, Rep. Jim Clyburn presented her with the President's Volunteer Service Award. In an accompanying note, President Joe Biden wrote, "we are living in a moment that calls for your hope and your light." Charleston mayor John Tecklenburg declared July 22 "Emily Meggett Day."

Personal life 
Meggett is so beloved in the Edisto Island community that, according to The New York Times, "no one charges her for anything." Most days, she cooks more food than she needs and leaves her side door open so that neighbors know that she has a meal to spare.  

Emily Meggett's late husband, Jessie, was a fellow member of Gullah culture. He grew up in a two-room cabin that had previously been occupied by slaves. In 2017, his childhood home was moved to Smithsonian National Museum of African American History and Culture in Washington DC.  

Meggett has eleven children. She attends New First Missionary Baptist Church.

References 

1932 births
African-American history of South Carolina
American women historians
21st-century American women writers
American storytellers
Women storytellers
American women chefs
Living people